Verbena lasiostachys is a species of verbena known by the common name western vervain.

It is native to western North America from Oregon, throughout California, to Baja California. It is widespread and occurs in many types of habitat, including California chaparral and woodlands and the Sierra Nevada. It is also found in disturbed areas, where it grows like a common weed.

Description
Verbena lasiostachys is perennial herb produces one or more hairy, decumbent to erect stems up to 80 centimeters long. The hairy leaves are toothed or lobed and have short, winged petioles.

The inflorescence is made up of one to three spikes of flowers which are dense at the tip and more open on the lower part. Each small tubular flower has a hairy calyx of sepals and a purple corolla no more than half a centimeter wide.

External links
Jepson Manual Treatment — Verbena lasiostachys
Verbena lasiostachys Photo gallery

lasiostachys
Flora of California
Flora of Baja California
Flora of Oregon
Flora of the Cascade Range
Flora of the Klamath Mountains
Flora of the Sierra Nevada (United States)
Natural history of the California chaparral and woodlands
Natural history of the California Coast Ranges
Natural history of the Central Valley (California)
Natural history of the Channel Islands of California
Natural history of the Peninsular Ranges
Natural history of the San Francisco Bay Area
Natural history of the Santa Monica Mountains
Natural history of the Transverse Ranges
Flora without expected TNC conservation status